'Pistol' Pete Wilkinson is a former competitor in the UK Pickup Truck Racing series, and was also the occasional driver of the #9 Chevy Monte Carlo in the then SCSA MAC Tools V8 Trophy

Achievement

In June 2007, Pete became the first Pickup Truck Racing driver to pass the 20,000-point mark, on the all-time career points table. He held the title of all-time career top points scorer for several meetings before it was taken by Gavin Seager on 24 June 2007.

Career history

2008 Pickup Truck Racing Championship – 7th
2007 Pickup Truck Racing Championship – 4th
2006 Pickup Truck Racing Championship – 8th
2005 Pickup Truck Racing Championship – 7th
2004 Pickup Truck Racing Championship – 9th – 1 race win
2003 Pickup Truck Racing Championship – 8th
2002 Pickup Truck Racing Championship – 3rd – 1 race win, 5 fastest laps
2001 Pickup Truck Racing Championship – 3rd  – 2 race wins, 1 fastest lap
2000 Pickup Truck Racing Championship – 6th
1999 Pickup Trucks Rookie of the Year – 8th overall

Before joining the Pickup Truck Racing series, Pete raced in the XR3i championship

References

English racing drivers
Living people
Year of birth missing (living people)
ASCAR drivers